Roast or roasting may refer to:
 Roasting, a cooking method
 Roasting (metallurgy), a metallurgy process in which sulfidic ores are converted to oxides
 Roast (comedy), A type of humour involving an individual that is ridiculed and jokingly insulted by one or more people, for amusement or humiliation
 Sir Roast McDuck, a Disney character who is an ancestor of Scrooge McDuck and Donald Duck